Velké Všelisy is a municipality and village in Mladá Boleslav District in the Central Bohemian Region of the Czech Republic. It has about 400 inhabitants.

Administrative parts
Villages of Krušiny, Malé Všelisy and Zamachy are administrative parts of Velké Všelisy.

References

Villages in Mladá Boleslav District